Five Brushstrokes may refer to 

Five Brushstrokes (Lichtenstein sculpture) a sculpture by Roy Lichtenstein installed at the entrance of the New Orleans Museum of Art
Five Brushstrokes (Lichtenstein series) a sculptural series by Roy Lichtenstein installed at the entrance of the Indianapolis Museum of Art